KPR Ruch Chorzów is a women's handball team, based in Chorzów.

References

See also
 Handball in Poland
 Sports in Poland

Polish handball clubs
Sport in Chorzów